Jazz Heaven is a 1929 American pre-Code romantic comedy film directed by Melville Brown and written by Myles Connolly and J. Walter Ruben, based on a story by Pauline Forney and Dudley Murphy. It was moderately successful for RKO Pictures, and was released in both sound and silent versions.

Plot
Barry Holmes is a poor songwriter from the south who travels to New York City to be a success, bringing with him his prize possession, his piano. While trying to break into Tin Pan Alley, he stays at a boardinghouse run by Mrs. Langley, who insists that her house always be run with the highest propriety. Ruth Morgan lives in the room next to Holmes.  One night, he annoys the entire boarding house as he is trying to complete his song "Someone". He is stuck on the ending until he hears Ruth humming how she thinks it should go. Stunned, he goes to her room and invites her back to his to finish the song. Unfortunately, Mrs. Langley discovers the two unmarried people in his room, and summarily kicks him out, intending to keep his piano as payment for back rent.

Ruth works for music publisher Kemple and Klucke and plots to get them to publish Holmes' song.  Both of her bosses are interested in Ruth, even though Kemple is quite a bit older than her. The two partners make a bet that the younger Klucke cannot take Ruth out to dinner. Ruth makes a deal with Kemple not to agree to the dinner, but changes her mind when Klucke agrees to listen to Holmes' song if she accompanies him.

Mrs. Langley's husband, Max, has a soft spot for the young couple, and attempts to sneak Holmes' piano out of the rooming house.  Unfortunately, in the attempt, the piano is dropped down a flight of stairs, and broken into pieces. Distraught, Ruth and Barry are stuck on how they will finish the song in order to pitch it to Kemple and Klucke. To make up for the loss of the piano, Max sneaks them into a piano factory during the night, where they finalize the song. Unknown to them, the factory also has an open microphone to a radio station, and the song is actually broadcast over the air. The song is an instant hit, and a bidding war starts between Kemple and Klucke and Parker Pianos for the rights to the song. Holmes is a success, and, of course, ends up getting the girl.

Cast
Sally O'Neil as Ruth Morgan
Johnny Mack Brown as Barry Holmes (as John Mack Brown)
Clyde Cook as Max Langley
Joseph Cawthorn as Herman Kemple
Albert Conti as Walter Klucke
Blanche Friderici as Mrs. Langley
Henry Armetta  as Tony

Reception
Mordaunt Hall of The New York Times gave the film a mixed review and an overall good rating, while criticizing some of the individual plot points.

References

External links
 
 
 

1929 romantic comedy films
RKO Pictures films
American black-and-white films
Films directed by Melville W. Brown
American romantic comedy films
1929 films
1920s American films
1920s English-language films